RAAF Base Edinburgh  is a Royal Australian Air Force (RAAF) military airbase located in Edinburgh approximately  north of Adelaide, South Australia, Australia and forms part of the Edinburgh Defence Precinct.

The base is primarily home to No 92 Wing and their Boeing P-8 Poseidon maritime patrol aircraft that conduct surveillance operations throughout Australia's region of interest. The base is also the home of the Air Warfare Centre which is responsible through its Air Force Ranges Directorate for the Woomera Test Range. The base has over the past decade become home to elements of the 1st Brigade of the Australian Army.

History
The construction of RAAF Base Edinburgh commenced in 1953 and it was officially opened 22 March 1954 as a support base for weapons development at the joint UK-Australian Weapons Research Establishment (WRE) at Woomera and Maralinga. The support base had previously been based at a small Edinburgh Airfield and at RAAF Base Mallala. The base was located alongside the wartime Salisbury Explosives Factory, in open fields between the then country villages of Salisbury (to the south) and Smithfield (to the north). At about the same time, the satellite town of Elizabeth was being established (to the east).

Support for WRE testing activities had greatly reduced by the late 1960s. In 1968, No. 11 Squadron relocated to Edinburgh operating Orions. In the late 1970s, No. 10 Squadron also operating Orions relocated to Edinburgh and a maritime patrol wing No. 92 Wing was established at Edinburgh making it the primary base for Australia's maritime reconnaissance operations. RAAF Base Edinburgh has since been home to No 1 Recruit Training Unit, the Institute of Aviation Medicine (AVMED) and the Aircraft Research and Development Unit (ARDU).

Originally, RAAF Edinburgh and the DSTO were located in Salisbury, (subsequently the suburb of Salisbury – Postcode 5108), in the City of Salisbury. In 1997, the Department of Defence decided to rationalise the then "DSTO Salisbury" site and sell off about 70% of the site, and surrounding "Defence-owned" Crown land, to form the "Edinburgh Parks" industrial estate. The suburb of Salisbury was split in two, with the part containing the RAAF Base and DSTO renamed "Edinburgh" (after the RAAF Base). The new suburb was  assigned the Postcode 5111.

On 5 December 2003, stage one of the redevelopment of the base was opened including facilities for the newly formed Aerospace Operational Support Group, and for the Aircraft Research and Development Unit which had relocated from DSTO Salisbury, and for Defence Materiel Organisation units - the Maritime Patrol System Program office and the Aeronautical Life Support Logistics Management Unit.

In August 2012, stage two of the redevelopment of the base was completed including a new air traffic control tower and facilities for No. 462 Squadron, which had relocated from Canberra, and for No. 87 Squadron.

On 19 November 2017, the Defence Minister announced that the base would be upgraded to operate the P-8A Poseidon including new facilities, infrastructure and airfield works with a strengthened and extended runway (by ).

In November 2019, the base held the 'Edinburgh Air Show 2019' over two days the 9th and 10th.

Environmental contamination
In 2016 concerns were raised about perfluorooctane sulfonate (PFOS) and perfluorooctanoic acid (PFOA), used in fire fighting foams at the base until 2004, being found in groundwater at the base and in nearby wetlands. A 2014 report from the United States Environmental Protection Agency described PFOA and PFOS as emergent contaminants that are "extremely persistent in the environment and resistant to typical environmental degradation processes" and which consequently pose "potential adverse effects for the environment and human health" due to their toxicity, mobility, and ability to bioaccumulation.

Current Air Force units

Army 1st Brigade
The Hardened and Networked Army plan was announced in December 2005 to relocate elements of the Australian Army's 1st Brigade to RAAF Base Edinburgh which was later altered by the Enhanced Land Force plan released in August 2006 changing the mechanised infantry battalion to be relocated. An extensive building program was undertaken to provide new working accommodation and joint Army and RAAF training facilities, a combined mess, fitness, health and community facilities. On 9 September 2011, the new facilities were officially opened with the 7th Battalion, Royal Australian Regiment (7 RAR) a mechanised infantry battalion housed at Horseshoe Lines. 7 RAR had relocated from Robertson Barracks in Darwin earlier in the year in January. The new facilities housed other relocated units including the 102nd (Coral) Battery from 8th/12th Regiment, Royal Australian Artillery, 9th Field Squadron from 1st Combat Engineer Regiment, 1st Combat Services Support Team from 1st Combat Service Support Battalion and a detachment from Headquarters 1st Brigade.

In November 2017, the 1st Armoured Regiment relocated from Robertson Barracks to Chauvel Lines at RAAF Base Edinburgh as part of the Plan Beersheba reorganisation of the Army. D Squadron had earlier relocated in January 2014.

Current Army units
The following units are based at RAAF Base Edinburgh:
1st Brigade Headquarters (Southern Detachment) 
1st Armoured Regiment
Headquarters Squadron
A Squadron – Cavalry (equipped with the ASLAV)
B Squadron – Tank (equipped with the M1A1 Abrams)
C Squadron – Cavalry (equipped with the ASLAV)
Support Squadron
7th Battalion, Royal Australian Regiment
Battalion Headquarters
Rifle Companies (Alpha, Bravo, and Charlie)
Support Company
Administration Company
1st Combat Service Support Team (1st Combat Service Support Battalion)

See also 

 Structure of the Royal Australian Air Force
 Australian Defence Basketball Association
 List of airports in South Australia
 List of Royal Australian Air Force installations

References

External links 
 

Royal Australian Air Force bases
Buildings and structures in Adelaide
Airports in South Australia
Military airbases established in 1955
Military installations in South Australia
1955 establishments in Australia